The David J. Langum Sr. Prizes are American literary awards for historical fiction, biography and legal history. They have been awarded annually since 2001 by the Langum Charitable Trust. 

The Langum Prize for American Historical Fiction (or David J. Langum, Sr. Prize in American Historical Fiction) is awarded for historical fiction and given since 2003. The prize is for $1,000 and is awarded annually at Wheeler Theater, Port Townsend, Washington, in conjunction with Centrum Foundation’s annual Writers Conference. The trust asks publishers to submit titles over the course of the year. Titles submitted are pre-selected by the trust based on what the trust believes would be appropriate for the prize.

The David J. Langum, Sr. Prize in American Legal History or Biography (or Langum Prize for Legal History or Biography) is awarded for legal history or biography and given since 2001. The prize is for $1,000 and is awarded annually at the Birmingham Public Library, Birmingham, Alabama. The ceremony is sponsored by the Friends of the Birmingham Public Library and the Birmingham Public Library.

Honorees
Past winners and honorees of the David J. Langum Sr. Prizes.

2001 (Historical Fiction Prize): No Award
2001 (Legal History): Elizabeth Urban Alexander, Notorious Woman: The Celebrated Case of Myra Clark Gaines (Louisiana State University Press)

2002 (Historical Fiction Prize): No Award
2002 (Legal History): Stuart Banner, The Death Penalty: An American History (Harvard University Press)
2002 (Legal History): Lawrence M. Friedman, American Law in the 20th Century (Yale University Press) 

2003 (Historical Fiction Prize): Robert J. Begiebing, Rebecca Wentworth’s Distraction: A Novel (University Press of New England)
2003 (Legal History): Robert J. Cottrol, Raymond T. Diamond, and Leland B. Ware, Brown v. Board of Education: Caste, Culture, and the Constitution (University Press of Kansas) 

2004 (Historical Fiction Prize): Linda Busby Parker, Seven Laurels: A Novel (Southeast Missouri State University Press)
 (Historical Fiction Honorable Mention): Sanora Babb, Whose Names Are Unknown: A Novel (University of Oklahoma Press)
2004 (Legal History): John M. Ferren, Salt of the Earth, Conscience of the Court: The Story of Justice Wiley Rutledge (University of North Carolina Press)

2005 (Historical Fiction Prize): Peter Donahue, Madison House: A Novel (Hawthorne Books) 
2005 (Legal History): Richard J. Ellis, To the Flag: The Unlikely History of the Pledge of Allegiance (University Press of Kansas)
 (Legal History Honorable Mention): John W. Johnson, Griswold v. Connecticut: Birth Control and the Constitutional Right of Privacy (Kansas University Press

2006 (Historical Fiction Prize): Sheldon Russell, Dreams to Dust: A Tale of the Oklahoma Land Rush (University of Oklahoma Press)
2006 (Legal History): Saul Cornell, A Well-Regulated Militia: The Founding Fathers and the Origins of Gun Control in America (Oxford University Press)
 (Legal History Honorable Mention): Carolyn N. Long, Mapp v. Ohio: Guarding against Unreasonable Searches and Seizures (University Press of Kansas)

2007 (Historical Fiction Prize): Kurt Andersen, Heyday (Random House) 
2007 (Legal History): Bruce J. Dierenfield, The Battle over School Prayer: How Engel v. Vitale Changed America (University Press of Kansas)

2008 (Historical Fiction Prize): Kathleen Kent, The Heretic’s Daughter (Little, Brown)
 (Historical Fiction Honorable Mention): Elisabeth Payne Rosen, Hallam’s War (Unbridled Books) 
 (Historical Fiction Director’s Mention): Jack Fuller, Abbeville (Unbridled Books)
2008 (Legal History): Ernest Freeberg, Democracy’s Prisoner: Eugene V. Debs, the Great War, and the Right to Dissent (Harvard University Press)
 (Legal History Honorable Mention): Peter Charles Hoffer, The Treason Trials of Aaron Burr (University Press of Kansas)

2009 (Historical Fiction Prize): Edward Rutherfurd, New York: The Novel (Doubleday). 
 (Historical Fiction Director’s Mention): Elizabeth Cobbs Hoffman, In the Lion's Den: A Novel of the Civil War (iUniverse)
 (Historical Fiction Director’s Mention): Jamie Ford, Hotel on the Corner of Bitter and Sweet (Random House)
2009 (Legal History): No Award

2010 (Historical Fiction Prize): Ann Weisgarber, The Personal History of Rachel DuPree (Viking)
 (Historical Fiction Honorable Mention): Robin Oliveira, My Name is Mary Sutter (Viking)
 (Historical Fiction Director’s Mention): Kelli Carmean, Creekside: An Archeological Novel (University of Alabama Press)
 (Historical Fiction Director’s Mention): Jackson Taylor, The Blue Orchard (Simon & Schuster)
2010 (Legal History): Stephen C. Neff, Justice in Blue and Gray: A Legal History of the Civil War

2011 (Historical Fiction Prize): Julie Otsuka, The Buddha in the Attic
 (Historical Fiction Honorable Mention): Geraldine Brooks, Caleb's Crossing
 (Historical Fiction Director’s Mention): John M. Archer, After the Rain: A Novel of War and Coming Home
 (Historical Fiction Director’s Mention): James Hoggard, The Mayor’s Daughter
 (Historical Fiction Director’s Mention): Hugh Nissenson, The Pilgrim: A Novel 
 (Historical Fiction Director’s Mention): Sheila Ortiz-Taylor, Homestead
 (Historical Fiction Director’s Mention): Shirley Reva Vernick, The Blood Lie
2011 (Legal History): Stuart Banner, American Property: A History of How, Why, and What We Own
2011 (Legal History): Joanna L. Grossman and Lawrence M. Friedman, Inside the Castle: Law and the Family in 20th Century America

2012 (Historical Fiction Prize): Ron Rash, The Cove
(Historical Fiction Honorable Mention):  Steve Wiegenstein, Slant of Light: A Novel of Utopian Dreams and Civil War
2012 (Legal History/Biography): Samuel Walker, Presidents and Civil Liberties from Wilson to Obama: A Story of Poor Custodians
(Legal History/Biography Honorable Mention): R. Kent Newmyer, The Treason Trial of Aaron Burr: Law, Politics, and the Character Wars of the New Nation

2013 (Historical Fiction Prize): Gary Schanbacher, Crossing Purgatory
(Historical Fiction Honorable Mention): Christine Wade, Seven Locks
2013 (Legal History/Biography): Whitney Strub, Obscenity Rules: Roth v. United States and the Long Struggle over Sexual Expression
(Legal History/Biography Honorable Mention): Alexander Wohl, Father, Son, and Constitution: How Justice Tom Clark and Attorney General Ramsey Clark Shaped American Democracy

2014 (Historical Fiction Prize): Kimberly Elkins, What is Visible
(Historical Fiction Honorable Mention): Catherine Bell, Rush of Shadows
(Historical Fiction Director's Mention): Laila Lalami, The Moor's Account 
2014 (Legal History/Biography): Nathaniel Grow, Baseball on Trial: The Origin of Baseball's Antitrust Exemption
(Legal History/Biography Honorable Mention): Lori Sturdevant, Her Honor: Rosalie Wahl and the Minnesota Women's Movement

2015 (Historical Fiction Prize): Faith Sullivan, Good Night, Mr. Wodehouse
(Historical Fiction Honorable Mention): Meg Waite Clayton, The Race for Paris
2015 (Legal History/Biography): Leonard L. Richards, Who Freed the Slaves? The Fight over the Thirteenth Amendment
(Legal History/Biography Honorable Mention): Nancy Woloch, A Class by Herself: Protective Laws for Women Workers, 1890s-1990s

2016 (Historical Fiction Prize):  Michele Moore, The Cigar Factory
(Historical Fiction Finalist): Chad Dundas, Champion of the World 
2016 (Legal History/Biography): Risa Goluboff, Vagrant Nation: Police Power, Constitutional Change, and the Making of the 1960s
(Legal History/Biography Finalist): Edward B. Foley, Ballot Battles: The History of Disputed Elections in the United States
(Legal History/Biography Finalist): Charles F. Hobson, The Great Yazoo Lands Sale: The Case of Fletcher v. Peck

References

External links
David J. Langum, Sr. Prize in American Legal History or Biography, official website
David J. Langum, Sr. Prize in American Historical Fiction, official website
Past winners

Awards established in 2001
American literary awards
2001 establishments in the United States